The 2012–13 Tour de Ski was the seventh edition of the Tour de Ski. The event began in Oberhof, Germany on December 29, 2012, and ended in Val di Fiemme, Italy on January 6, 2013. The women's trophy was won by defending champion Justyna Kowalczyk (Poland) while the men's trophy was won by Russian Alexander Legkov ahead of defending champion Dario Cologna of Switzerland.

Schedule

Final standings

Overall standings
Final standings, with bonus seconds deducted.

Sprint standings
Final sprint standings, all bonus seconds counts.

Stages

Stage 1
29 December 2012, Oberhof, Germany - prologue

Stage 2
30 December 2012, Oberhof, Germany

Stage 3
1 January 2013, Val Müstair, Switzerland - sprint

Stage 4
3 January 2013, Cortina d'Ampezzo – Toblach - distance (handicap start)

Stage 5
4 January 2013, Val di Fiemme - distance (individual start)

Stage 6
5 January 2013, Val di Fiemme - distance (mass start)

Stage 7
6 January 2013, Val di Fiemme - distance (final climb)

References

External links

2012–13 FIS Cross-Country World Cup
Tour de Ski by year
Tour de Ski
Tour de Ski
Tour de Ski
Tour de Ski
Tour de Ski
Tour de Ski
Tour de Ski